Potassium voltage-gated channel subfamily D member 3 also known as Kv4.3 is a protein that in humans is encoded by the KCND3 gene. It contributes to the cardiac transient outward potassium current (Ito1), the main contributing current to the repolarizing phase 1 of the cardiac action potential.

Function 

Voltage-gated potassium (Kv) channels represent the most complex class of voltage-gated ion channels from both functional and structural standpoints. Their diverse functions include regulating neurotransmitter release, heart rate, insulin secretion, neuronal excitability, epithelial electrolyte transport, smooth muscle contraction, and cell volume. Four sequence-related potassium channel genes – shaker, shaw, shab, and shal – have been identified in Drosophila, and each has been shown to have human homolog(s).

Kv4.3 is a member of the potassium channel, voltage-gated, shal-related subfamily, members of which form voltage-activated A-type potassium ion channels and are prominent in the repolarization phase of the action potential. This member includes two isoforms with different sizes, which are encoded by alternatively spliced transcript variants of this gene.

Clinical significance 

Gain of function is believed to cause Brugada syndrome although only indirectly shown by mutations in the beta subunit KCNE3 which causes gain of function of Kv4.3.

See also
 Voltage-gated potassium channel

References

Further reading

External links
  GeneReviews/NIH/NCBI/UW entry on Brugada syndrome